16th September is a painting by René Magritte, probably produced in 1956. It is now in the Royal Museum of Fine Arts, Antwerp, which bought it directly from the artist. The painting depicts a tree surrounded by empty space with rocks, and near the middle of the tree the Moon is shown.

References

1956 paintings
Paintings by René Magritte
Paintings in the collection of the Royal Museum of Fine Arts Antwerp
Moon in art